Gustav Jäger may refer to:

 Gustav Jäger (painter) (1808–1871), German painter
 Gustav Jäger (naturalist) (1832–1917), German naturalist and hygienist